The OFC U-16 Women's Championship (previously the OFC U-17 Women's Championship or OFC Women's Under 17 Qualifying Tournament) an Oceanic association football tournament held to determine the team that will appear in the Women's U-17 World Cup. The competition is organised by the Oceania Football Confederation (OFC) and was first held in 2010.

There was no OFC qualifying tournament to the first world cup in 2008, as New Zealand classified automatically as hosts.

The inaugural edition, held in New Zealand from 12 to 14 April 2010, was a group stage contested by only 4 of OFC's 11 teams to fill the only spot for the 2010 FIFA U-17 Women's World Cup. It was won by New Zealand, who won all their games without conceding a goal. The 2016 edition was the first to play a knock-out stage. New Zealand won its third title.

The most recent edition held in August 2017 was an under-16 edition, and the tournament was called the OFC U-16 Women's Championship.

Tournaments
Because the 2014 World Cup was already held in March, no sufficient early date could be found for the OFC qualifier. The tournament was cancelled and New Zealand sent to the World Cup by default.

U17 format

U16 format

Performances by countries

Awards

Champion's U-17 World Cup record
New Zealand qualified for all the editions of the FIFA U-17 Women's World Cup:

 In 2008, they receive an authomatic berth as host.
 In both 2014 and 2022 editions, they qualified by default, as no OFC qualifier was held due to concerns about dates.
 For the 2010, 2012, 2016 and 2018 editions, New Zealand qualified as Oceanian champions.

Legend
 – Champions
 – Runners-up
 – Third place
 – Fourth place
SF – Semifinals
QF – Quarterfinals
GS – Group Stage
R1 – Round 1, Group stage
 – Hosts

References

External links
OFC Official Website

 
Under
Under-17 association football